The Sunday Sun or Sunday Sun may refer to:

Newspapers
 Sunday Sun, a regional Sunday newspaper in North East England

 Sunday Sun (South Africa), a South African Sunday newspaper 
 Sun on Sunday, a Sunday edition of The Sun, a UK tabloid newspaper
 Sunday Herald Sun, Sunday edition of the Herald Sun, a regional Australian newspaper
 Sunday editions of Sun Media newspapers, Canadian tabloids
 The Sunday Sun (Sydney), a New South Wales newspaper, published 1903–1910

Songs
 "Sunday Sun" (Neil Diamond song), a 1968 single from Velvet Gloves and Spit
 "Sunday Sun" (Beck song), a 2002 song from Sea Change

See also
 Sun (disambiguation)
 The Sun (disambiguation)
 Sunday (disambiguation)